Mylochromis plagiotaenia is a species of cichlid endemic to Lake Malawi where it is known from the southern arms of the lake.  This species can reach a length of  TL.  This species can also be found in the aquarium trade.

References

Fish of Malawi
plagiotaenia
Fish described in 1922
Taxonomy articles created by Polbot
Fish of Lake Malawi